René Formánek (born 9 January 1975) is a Czech former football player.

Formánek played for several Gambrinus liga clubs during his career, including 1. FC Slovácko and FK Drnovice.

External links
 Profile at iDNES.cz
 Profile at 1. FC Slovácko website
 Profile at SFC Opava website

Czech footballers
1975 births
Living people
Czech First League players
1. FC Slovácko players
1. FK Příbram players
SK Sigma Olomouc players
SFC Opava players
Sportspeople from Nový Jičín
FK Drnovice players
Association football defenders
FK Fotbal Třinec players